Tipton is a town in the western part of Tillman County, Oklahoma, United States. The population was 847 at the United States 2010 census, a 31.6 percent decline from 1,238 in 2000. 

Tipton also is home to Tipton Home, originally called Tipton Orphans' Home, a home for children, established in 1921, when Sol and Maggie Tipton donated a plot of land in Canadian, Texas to the founders. The Tipton Church of Christ moved the home to Tipton in 1924, where it still operated into the 21st century.

History
The community was originally called Farmersville, but the name was changed to Stinson, honoring W. A. Stinson who owned the townsite. He sold the site to investors from Elk City. The town moved in 1909 to a location closer to the newly-laid Wichita Falls and Northwestern Railway (acquired by the Missouri, Kansas and Texas Railway in 1911). The townspeople voted to change the name again to Tipton, honoring John J. Tipton, conductor of the first train to pass through the area. A town plat was filed on July 29, 1909, and a post office was opened on September 18, 1909. The population was 441 in 1910.

During World War II, the U.S. government built a prisoner-of-war (POW) camp outside of town to house German soldiers.

On May 16, 2015, the town was nearly hit by a violent wedge tornado.

Although Tipton lies in a hot, dry area, the soil of the area around the town is rich and, with the coming of irrigation, proved quite suited to growing cotton. The town economy has been based on serving the local agricultural industry. The population grew until it hit a peak in 1940, then dropped until 1960, when it dipped to 1117. It rose again to an all-time peak of 1475 in 1980, and has since fallen backward again.

Geography
Tipton is located at  (34.503358, -99.139064).

Tipton lies on the northern portion of the Tillman Terrace Aquifer, an alluvial aquifer in western Tillman County, associated with the southern extent of the North Fork of the Red River. The farmland surrounding Tipton is noted for high-quality soils. "Tipton loam" is considered to be among the most ideal soils in the United States. Much of the farmland is devoted to irrigated cotton. Other crops include alfalfa, silage corn, and wheat. Truck crops were grown in this area until the 1950s and have made a recent comeback.

Demographics

As of the census of 2000, 916 people, 396 households, and 270 families resided in the town. The 486 housing units averaged 744.9 per square mile (288.7/km). The racial makeup of the town was 78.71% White, 10.04% African American, 1.75% Native American, 0.11% Asian, 7.75% from other races, and 1.64% from two or more races. Hispanics or Latinos of any race were 13.32% of the population.

Of the 396 households, 29.8% had children under the age of 18 living with them, 52.0% were married couples living together, 12.4% had a female householder with no husband present, and 31.8% were not families. About 31.1% of all households were made up of individuals, and 18.7% had someone living alone who was 65 years of age or older. The average household size was 2.31, and the average family size was 2.87.

In the town, the population was distributed as 25.2% under the age of 18, 7.3% from 18 to 24, 22.7% from 25 to 44, 23.3% from 45 to 64, and 21.5% who were 65 years of age or older. The median age was 41 years. For every 100 females, there were 92.8 males. For every 100 females age 18 and over, there were 85.1 males.

The median income for a household in the town was $24,432, and for a family was $30,735. Males had a median income of $27,353 versus $19,375 for females. The per capita income for the town was $12,217. About 14.1% of families and 19.3% of the population were below the poverty line, including 20.6% of those under age 18 and 19.4% of those age 65 or over.

References

External links
Tipton - Encyclopedia of Oklahoma History and Culture

Towns in Tillman County, Oklahoma
Towns in Oklahoma